Muraki (written: 村木 lit. "village tree") is a Japanese surname. Notable people with the surname include:

, Japanese LGBT activist
, Japanese production designer and art director
, Japanese production designer, art director and costume designer
, Japanese triple jumper

Fictional characters
, a character in the manga series Descendants of Darkness

Japanese-language surnames